Bach and Broccoli is a Canadian children's film, released in 1986. Directed by André Melançon, it is the third film in the Tales for All series of children's and family films.

The film stars Mahée Paiement as Fanny, a young orphan girl living with her uncle (Raymond Legault), who is named Jean-Claude in the French version and Jonathan in the English. Her uncle, an accountant and amateur classical musician, pays little attention to her as he is obsessed with practicing the music of Johann Sebastian Bach on his organ for an upcoming music competition; Fanny, meanwhile, takes advantage of his negligence to collect a menagerie of animals beginning with her pet skunk Broccoli/Bottine. The situation eventually draws the attention of the local child services, who threaten to remove Fanny from the home to place her with a new foster family.

At the 8th Genie Awards in 1987, Andrée Pelletier garnered a Genie Award nomination for Best Supporting Actress for her performance as Bérénice.

References

External links

1986 films
Canadian children's comedy films
Films directed by André Melançon
1980s children's films
French-language Canadian films
1980s Canadian films